Atrocalopteryx atrata is a species of  damselfly belonging to the family Calopterygidae. It is native to Asia, where it is widespread in China, Korea, and Japan.

This species lives near rivers and streams in flatland habitat, open forests, and sometimes urban areas.

References

Calopterygidae
Insects described in 1853